The William Bland House near Glendale, Kentucky was built in 1850 by builder John Y. Hill.  It was listed on the National Register of Historic Places in 1988.

It is a two-story central passage plan brick house with elements of Federal style including its main entrance with three sidelight windows on each side and six transom windows, the only such entrance in Hardin County.  The brick is laid in Flemish bond.  It has brick dentils at its eaves.  Its log kitchen was originally separate but was connected in c.1900.

References

Houses on the National Register of Historic Places in Kentucky
Federal architecture in Kentucky
Houses completed in 1850
Houses in Hardin County, Kentucky
National Register of Historic Places in Hardin County, Kentucky
1850 establishments in Kentucky
Central-passage houses